The Somerset Premier Cup is an association football knock-out cup competition run by the Somerset County Football Association (SFA).

According to the current rules of the competition, to enter clubs first affiliation must be with the Somerset County FA, have the use of floodlights and be of a minimum of Western League standard (Level 10 of the English football league system).

The competition was first held during the 1928–29 season known as the Somerset Professional Cup, replacing the Somerset Senior Cup as the most prestigious County cup in Somerset. The first competition featured the three professional sides in the county at the time, Bath City, Taunton Town and Yeovil & Petters United, with the format initially being a round-robin tournament. Since 1934, the tournament has been a knock-out competition, while the format of the final has varied over the years, between being a two legged affair or a single match.

The first winner of the tournament was Bath City. The most recent winners are Yeovil Town, the most successful team with twenty-five wins, who defeated Bath City 3–0 in the 2022 final.

Current participants (2022–23)

Finals

Results

Records and statistics

Performances by club

Other Somerset FA County Cup competitions 
In addition to the Somerset Premier Cup, the Somerset FA also run the following competitions, which are also often referred to as the Somerset FA County Cup:

 Somerset FA Senior Cup
 Somerset FA Junior Cup
 Somerset FA Intermediate Cup
 Somerset FA Sunday Challenge Cup
 Somerset FA Legends League Cup

 Somerset FA Women's Senior Cup
 Somerset FA Women's Junior Cup
 Somerset FA Youth Shield (Under 16)
 Somerset FA Girls U16 Cup

 Somerset FA Boys U15 Cup
 Somerset FA Lewin Cup (Under 14)
 Somerset FA Girls U14 Cup
 Somerset FA Boys U13 Cup

References

External links
Somerset Premier Cup at the Somerset FA website

County Cup competitions
Football in Somerset
Recurring sporting events established in 1929
1929 establishments in England